The country of Costa Rica has many kinds of music.

Though its music has achieved little international credit, Costa Rican popular music genres include an indigenous calypso scene, which is distinct from the more widely known Trinidadian calypso sound, as well as a thriving disco audience that supports nightclubs in cities such as San José. American and British rock and roll and pop are very popular and common among the youth (especially urban youth), while dance-oriented genres including soca, salsa, merengue, cumbia and Tex-Mex have an appeal among a somewhat older audience.

Mexican music is very popular among older people and some people in the countryside. During the middle years of the 20th century, Costa Rica was exposed to much Mexican cultural influence.

Another new genre explored in Costa Rica is Celtic with the group Peregrino Gris.

Folk Music

The Caribbean coast shows a strong African influence in the complex percussion rhythms such as sinkit. Like its northerly neighbors in Central America, the marimba is a very popular instrument, and Costa Rican marimba music is very popular.  In modern times, groups such as Cantares have helped to popularize Costa Rican folk music, and were a leading part of the New Costa Rican Song movement .

Costa Rica's pre-Columbian population has contributed a large part of the country's folk heritage, include rare musical scales, certain ceremonial songs and ocarinas. The Guanacaste region, in the Nicoya Peninsula, is home to the best-known folk traditions. Along the Atlantic coast, the African musical heritage is more pronounced, and Afro-Caribbean music including rumba, calypso and reggae are popular.

In most of Costa Rica, ancient instruments such as ocarinas are being replaced by international instruments such as accordions and guitars. There are still folk styles, even outside of Guanacaste, such as the Talamanca (canton)'s Danza de los Huelos and the Boruca people's Danza de los Diablitos.

Guanacaste is the major center for Costa Rican folk music, especially pre-Columbian styles such as the Danza del Sol and Danza de la Luna of the Chorotega, who also popularized the ancient quijongo (a single-string bow and gourd resonator) and native oboe, the chirimia .

Costa Rica's population never developed a major rhythm or style that became a major part of popular music, but there have been exceptions, such as the Costa Rican landscape school of painting in the 1920s. The Andean peña tradition (an international gathering of like-minded persons) is strong in Costa Rica as well, introduced by immigrants from Chile and Argentina.

In the late 1980s some local artists and bands became famous for having their own style and original material, such as José Capmany, Distorsión, Café con Leche, Modelo Para Armar and Inconsciente Colectivo; some of them had fans from outside of Costa Rica, such as Editus, a Grammy winning contemporary jazz ensemble. At around that time a popular Latin genre developed, chiqui-chiqui (a mixture of merengue, cumbia and other Latin rhythms along with afro-pop influences) as it was known, led by bands such as Los Hicsos,Jaque Mate, La Pandylla, Manantial and La Banda with well-known classic hits such as La Avispa, El cangrejo, Julieta, El criticon, El hula hula etc.

After losing popularity around the 1990s, chiqui chiqui has resurfaced and established itself as one of the most popular and recognizable music among Costa Ricans, thanks in part to the release of CD re-editions of many classic hits.
Some examples of Costa Rican hits with Chiqui chiqui are:

From the late 1990s to the present time, there has emerged a newer local rock style led by bands such as Gandhi, Evolución, Tango India, Suite Doble, Alma Bohemia, and Kadeho, all of which have been accepted positively by Costa Rican youths. There are Metal bands, including Grecco, Advent of Bedlam, Corpse Garden, Catarsis Incarne, Heresy, to name but a few.

The rock bands begins a new standard to CR's music with bands such as Time's Forgotten, Pneuma and Sight of Emptiness making really high albums and concerts. The international community starts to take a look at Costa Rica where bands such as Time's Forgotten plays in BajaProg (Rock Festival) and have several reviews in the best progressive magazines, sites, and radios. For example, Dividing Line put the album "Dandelion" between the best 15 album in the 2009.

Costa Rica has become a centerfold for international Rock and Metal concerts. Bands such as: Deep Purple, Aerosmith, Anthrax, Red Hot Chili Peppers, Pearl Jam, Cannibal Corpse, Apocalyptica, Arch Enemy, Green Day, Helloween, Rhapsody Of Fire, Epica, Nightwish, had come to play in the country, as well as international singers and musicians like Paul McCartney and Carlos Santana.

It became better with the coming of Iron Maiden back in 2008 for the Somewhere Back in Time World Tour, according to sponsors and the Flight 666 documentary, the concert held in Costa Rica was the largest in Central America, with over 27,000 attendants. With that concert, Costa Rica is now becoming an important stop for Metal bands. Examples of this are Metallica, Megadeth, Slayer, Judas Priest, Black Sabbath and Opeth.

Also bands venturing into Reggae and Ska are popular, one example is Mekatelyu and Michael Livingston.

Malpaís, a band emerging from the Guanacaste-area, is one of the central bands of the Costa Rican rock and music scene of today, mixing traditional Costa Rican folk and Latin music with jazz and rock and has met great success in Costa Rica and surrounding countries. Cantoamerica is a band led by Manuel Monestel that for many years has developed research and promotion of the music of the Costa Rican Caribbean coast. Calypso music and other caribbean sounds are included in the band´s repertoire. Cantoamerica has traveled all over the world as ambassador of Afro Costa Rican music.

For all the fanfare of rock, electronic or world music, Latin music is somehow the most common music genre in some specific sectors, and visitors will find that most Costa Ricans of certain generations favor Latin music (Cuban, Mexican and Colombian).

Costa Rica's music also includes hip hop,Reggae and electronic. Such artist as Sirius the Dogg Starr, Tiko305, Crypy 626, Huba, Toledo, Gtermis (Ragga by Roots), Charli VL, AXB, Bega, Tapon, shel, gonin, banton y ghetto, kike,  Tinez, Original Warrior Street Reggae Artist, 
Poeta, Mr Pray, Jahricio, Rude Boy, Talawa Reggae Army. Hip hop, Reggae, electronic producers such as DJ P, Zion, Killa, aRNine, Chino Artavia, Rooper Francheschi, Kastro, Del Bloke, DJ Arturo morales, DJ Cole, DJ accion, DJ juan, DJ gerarld, DJ action, Marfil (group), moonlight dub (group) have a huge Hip Hop, Reggae, electronic influence in their music. Many of these artists have recorded and produced for local artists and international artists. Starting in the Mids 90s Costa Rican Hip Hop and Reggae culture has grown. Artist Tapon and group Ragga by Roots were the most famous artists in the late 90s with Hits such as "Creada a mi manera" by Tapon and "Sentimientos" by Ragga by Roots. DJ P working mainly on his mixtape and Toledo's CDs. Tiko has released 2 successful mixtapes, Tiko's Blood Vol. 1 and Tiko's Blood vol. 2.

Classical music
Costa Rica also has a youth symphony orchestra, founded by ex-President José Figueres Ferrer in the 1970. "Concertina Ana Gabriela Castro-Rosabal" was the first 4-year-old girl/ child/Costa Rican to direct the Youth Symphony Orchestra into tuning in its 1970 Debut, and first 4-year-old violin soloist to play Mozart under the direction of director Gerald Brown. Violinist Ana Gabriela Castro-Rosabal, master in violin performance was the key performer for the youth symphony orchestra Debut in 1970. "La niña violinista del Taburete" was how newspapers used to refer to 4-year-old violin "Concertina Ana Gabriela Castro-Rosabal". This affectionate title, was given due to the fact, that she was so small, that she used a wooden box, made by her father Enrique, to rest her feet. The wooden box, became the "symbol" of how young this talented girl was.

Music institutions

Classical music performing organizations include the Costa Rican National Symphony Orchestra (formed in 1970), which has been conducted by Americans Gerald Brown and Irwin Hoffman, followed by the Japanese Chosei Komatsu. In 2014, Carl. St. Clair assumed the position as music director . The country is also home to an opera company, one of the first professional choirs in Central America, and a state-subsidized youth orchestra, which belongs to the National Symphony Orchestra. The Universidad de Costa Rica has a concert band and an orchestra, besides an early-music group and several chamber music groups.

The National University, Universidad Nacional, has a resident string quartet and a Symphony Orchestra, which had its very successful premiere at the National Theatre in San José on May 10, 2007, conducted by Dieter Lehnhoff. It has also a highly successful piano school led by the Russian virtuoso, Alexandr Sklioutovsky. Other well-known groups are the El Café Chorale and the Sura Chamber Choir and also the pianist Ismael Pacheco, who was the first Costa Rican pianist to have been performed at the prestigious Carnegie Hall in 2001 and also at the Musikverein in 2007 .

Both the Universidad de Costa Rica (UCR), in San José, and the Universidad Nacional (UNA), in Heredia, have well-structured programmes in Music, where students can pursue bachelor's degrees in instrumental and vocal performing, composition, and conducting. The latter also has a doctoral degree in Central American Arts and Letters, with an emphasis in Music.

Contemporary composers include Mario Alfagüell, Marvin Camacho, Alejandro Cardona, Bernal Flores, Benjamín Gutiérrez, Luis Diego Herra, and Eddie Mora, to name but a few.

Costa Rican folk institutions include the Fantasía Folklorica. Every August, Costa Rica is home to an International Festival of Music.

In recent years the government, led by the Ministerio de Cultura, has aimed to revitalize traditional Costa Rican music.

References

89decibeles.com is a costarrican online magazine about alternative music and pop culture.
FuenteRock.com is the Costa Rica rock website, here you can find info about practically any Costa Rican Rock Band
Vibratica.com is a Social Network that promotes Costa Rican Music
Time's Forgotten Official Website
National Artist Debi Nova
Benjamín Gutiérrez Sáenz Project (Dedicated to Costa Rica's Contemporary Music)
LA RETRETA, Academic Music Magazine of Costa Rica
Costa Rica Music Festival
Costa Rica Arts & Culture
adondeirhoy.com is an official site for information on Costa Rican music and local bands.
Ismael Pacheco Official Website
Grupo MalPais Official Website
José Daniel Zúñiga, National Folk Music Composer
Events Calendar of Costa Rica
Costa Rica's National Symphony Orchestra Official Website
Ópera De Cámara de Costa Rica
Anayanci Quirós, Costa Rican Soprano
Peregrino Gris Official Website
Papaya Music Record Label
Hotel de la música Costa Rica, music sessions
Orange County's Pacific Symphone Bio

Articles
[Campos Fonseca, Susan: "Historia compensatoria y Filosofía: Un caso centroamericano", en BABAB, Nº33, verano, España, 2008, ISSN · 1575-9385. Disponible en: http://www.babab.com/no33/susan_campos.php]
[Campos Fonseca, Susan: "'Com-poner' la historia sonora de un país". Disponible en: http://www.susancampos.es/blog/report-costa-rica/]

Costa Rican music